Middle Beach is a small town in South Australia located about  northwest of the Adelaide city centre. It is located in the Adelaide Plains Council.

Demographics

The 2006 Census by the Australian Bureau of Statistics counted 366 persons on Middle Beach on census night. Of these, 55.2% were male and 44.8% were female.

The majority of residents (66.1%) are of Australian birth, with other common census responses being England (4.6%) and Netherlands (3.0%).

The age distribution of Middle Beach residents is comparable to that of the greater Australian population. 68.8% of residents were over 25 years in 2006, compared to the Australian average of 66.5%; and 31.2% were younger than 25 years, compared to the Australian average of 33.5%.

Community
The local newspaper is the Plains Producer.

Attractions
Middle Beach is notable for its samphire swamplands and fishing in the mangroves. A boat ramp and small creek are located at the southern end of the shellgrit beach.

Transport
Middle Beach is located beside Port Wakefield Road.

See also
 The Family Murders

References

Coastal towns in South Australia
Beaches of South Australia
Gulf St Vincent